Adrián Horváth (born 20 November 1987) is a Hungarian football player.

Club career

Budapest Honved
He made his debut on 25 July 2009 against Kaposvári Rákóczi FC in a match that ended 2–1.

Club honours

Budapest Honvéd FC
Hungarian Super Cup:
Runners-up: 2009

References

External links

Player profile at HLSZ

1987 births
Living people
Sportspeople from Pécs
Hungarian footballers
Association football midfielders
Pécsi MFC players
Barcsi SC footballers
Kozármisleny SE footballers
Budapest Honvéd FC II players
Budapest Honvéd FC players
Gyirmót FC Győr players
Kisvárda FC players
Kaposvári Rákóczi FC players
Tiszakécske FC footballers
Nemzeti Bajnokság I players
Nemzeti Bajnokság II players
Nemzeti Bajnokság III players
21st-century Hungarian people